Irenes Challenger was an oil tanker that sank in 1977 in the Pacific Ocean.

Irenes Challenger was registered in Liberia, and was owned by the Greek company Tsakos Shipping and Trading when she was lost. The United States Coast Guard deployed a C-130 aircraft and the cutter USCGC Mallow to search for the missing crew, but they were never found. While the cargo of oil was lost, it was far enough offshore that it did not threaten land.

References

Maritime incidents in 1977
Oil tankers